The Buchanan Hotel is a hotel located in downtown Mercersburg, Pennsylvania, on North Main Street.  It was the boyhood home of the fifteenth President of the United States, James Buchanan, Jr. and was built by James Buchanan, Sr. in 1796.  Buchanan built it as a two-story brick residence, and the third story was added in the late nineteenth century. It is part of the Mercersburg Historic District, which was listed by the National Register of Historic Places in 1978. In 2022, the James Buchanan Hotel was bought by Capital Hotels Mercersburg, LLC and is currently owned and operated by Maxwell S Paul and family. The Paul's are excited to make the James Buchanan Hotel and Pub a must-see in the Mercersburg community.

Sources

Hotels in Pennsylvania